John Burnham (December 3, 1842 – December 29, 1897) was a Canadian physician and politician from the province of Ontario.

Born in St. Thomas, Canada West, the son of Mark Burnham, he came to the County of Peterborough with his father in 1852, and located in the Village of Ashburnham. He received his medical education in Toronto and graduated in 1862, when he commenced practice in Ashburnham. He was a captain in the 57th Regiment of Canadian Volunteer Militia, "Peterborough Rangers".

He was first elected to the House of Commons of Canada in the 1878 election for the riding of Peterborough East. A Conservative, he was re-elected in the 1882 election. He was defeated in the 1887 election and was re-elected in the 1891 election. He was defeated again in the 1896 election. He was also reeve of Ashburnham Township.

In 1868, he married Maria Rogers. Burnham died in Ashburnham at the age of 56.

References

1842 births
1897 deaths
Conservative Party of Canada (1867–1942) MPs
Members of the House of Commons of Canada from Ontario
People from St. Thomas, Ontario